"Island Man" is a  poem by Grace Nichols.  It is about a man living in London who is thinking about his former home in the Caribbean. 

1970s poems
Guyanese literature